The Ezourvedam is a forgery "consisting of certain 'Vedic' materials translated by Jesuits with the intention of isolating elements most in harmony with Christianity." Rather than an original Sanskrit work, the Ezourvedam turned out to be a French text, written by French Jesuits, and meant to be translated into Sanskrit.

History and authorship
A manuscript called Ezourvedam was given to Voltaire in 1760 by Louis-Laurent de Féderbe, Chevalier de Maudave. The text was in French, and said to be a French translation of a Sanskrit original. Voltaire was enthusiastic about the work, had it copied, and brought it to the attention of others. It was first published in 1778 (Voltaire died that same year).  The genuineness of the Ezourvedam was first questioned in 1782; these doubts were confirmed in 1822. Rather than an original Sanskrit work, the Ezourvedam turned out to be a French text, written by French Jesuits, and meant to be translated into Sanskrit.

Title
The name Ezourvedam was sometimes taken to be a corruption of Yajurveda, but the Ezourvedam has nothing in common with the Yajurveda. The Ezourvedam itself refers to the Yajurveda as Zozu-vedam. "Ezour" is the sandhi-form of "Ezous-", that is, "Jezus", based on the Latin pronunciation used by the Jesuits. The name "Ezourvedam" means something like "Gospel of Jesus".

Content 
Ezourvedam  is a French text in the form of a dialogue between two Vedic sages, one monotheist and one polytheist, they conclude the monotheism of 'pristine Hinduism' points to Christian truth and Hinduism is monotheism masquerading as polytheism concealing monotheism.

See also
 Roberto de Nobili
 Orientalism

References

Sources

Further reading
  
 

Voltaire